Anders Walter (born February 5, 1978) is a Danish filmmaker.

At the 86th Academy Awards held in March 2014, Walter and fellow producer Kim Magnusson won an Academy Award for Best Live Action Short Film for the 2013 film Helium.
In 2012, his short film 9-meter was shortlisted for the Academy Award for Best Live Action Short Film.

He is the twin-brother of Danish singer Rasmus Walter.

Filmography

References

External links

Danish film producers
Directors of Live Action Short Film Academy Award winners
Living people
1978 births